Carmel, Wales could refer to:
Carmel, Anglesey
Carmel, Carmarthenshire
Carmel, Flintshire
Carmel, Gwynedd
Carmel, Powys